Enriqueta Pinto Garmendia (1817 — 26 December 1904) was First Lady of Chile and the wife of President Manuel Bulnes.

She was born in Tucumán, Argentina, the daughter of President Francisco Antonio Pinto and of former First Lady . She was also the sister of President Aníbal Pinto.

References 

Argentine emigrants to Chile
Chilean people of Basque descent
First ladies of Chile
People from Santiago
19th-century Chilean people
1817 births
1904 deaths